Rosemary A. Stevens (born 1935) is a historian of American medicine and health policy.

Education
Stevens received her Bachelor of Arts from St. Hilda's College and Master of Arts from Oxford University. She received her MPH in health services administration and policy and Ph.D. in epidemiology from Yale University.

Career
After completing her MPH, Stevens oversaw a 100-bed hospital in London. She has since has held a number of academic positions including posts at Yale University Medical School and Tulane University.

At the University of Pennsylvania, she was Stanley I. Sheerr Professor in Arts and Sciences and served as dean of the School of Arts and Sciences, the first woman to hold the latter position. Stevens is a Senior Fellow in the Leonard Davis Institute of Health Economics and Professor Emerita of History and Sociology of Science in the School of Arts and Sciences.

 Stevens is DeWitt Wallace Distinguished Scholar in Social Medicine and Public Policy at the Weill Cornell Medical College.

Awards
Stevens was named a Guggenheim Fellow in 1983. In 1997, she received an Investigator Award from the Robert Wood Johnson Foundation for her work on specialization in American medicine. She's also a recipient of the William B. Graham Prize for Health Services Research and a fellow of the American Academy of Arts and Sciences.

Selected publications

References

1935 births
Living people
American medical historians
American women historians
Fellows of the American Academy of Arts and Sciences
University of Pennsylvania faculty
British expatriate academics in the United States
21st-century American women
Members of the National Academy of Medicine